Mayfield School is a mixed all-through school for pupils ages 4 to 16 located in North End, Portsmouth.

The school
The original school building was built in 1932 to the designs of the architect Adrien J. Sharp in the Neo-Georgian style. It comprised a central hall, with classrooms arranged around East and West quadrangles.[1] Additions were made to the rear in the 1950s and 60s, with a new science and woodwork block and sports hall being constructed in the 1970s. The building retained many of its original 1930s architectural features, including parquet flooring throughout, wall tiling in every room, fireplaces, stair balustrades, internal wooden windows and doors, etc.

Due to overdue maintenance the 1932 building required repairs and renovation, rather than pursuing this route funding was offered for a new building and this plan was agreed in 2017, with construction beginning on a new school building on the East playing field in 2020. This new school was ready for the 2021 September start of term and staff and students moved in and vacated the old building.

Despite local opposition to demolition, the old building was completely demolished in early 2022, except for the front portico with its decorative frieze and Portsmouth crest mosaic.[2]

History

Grammar school
The school is located in the buildings of the former Portsmouth Northern Grammar School for Boys and Portsmouth Northern Grammar School for Girls, which were opened in 1932. (The boys school had begun as the Northern Secondary School in Kingston in 1921). After wartime evacuation, the two secondary schools were re-established in 1946 as a result of the 1944 Education Act. The boys' school housed approximately 550 boys in 1970 and was run by the City of Portsmouth Education Committee.

Comprehensive
In 1975 the two schools were amalgamated with Brunel School (boys) and North End Modern Girls' School to form the largest comprehensive school in Portsmouth, with approximately 1800 pupils. The roll was later reduced by the setting up of Portsmouth's Sixth Form College with the school losing its sixth form.

In 1999, the school was failing academically and was placed in "special measures" after an Ofsted inspection said it was failing to provide an acceptable standard of education. With new teachers the school experienced a slight increase in academic achievement, with a 4% rise in GCSE achievement in 2004, compared with 2003.

In 2005, 150 students of the school launched a protest against the deportation of a fellow student, Lorin Sulaiman, who had previously immigrated from Syria in 2003 after fearing for her safety.

Major changes came with the arrival of new headteacher David Jeapes, who turned the school around from having a 'requiring improvement' rating in 2014 to its current 'good' Ofsted rating as of 10 November 2021. [1]

All-through

In September 2014 the school opened an infant and junior section of the school meaning that pupils can attend from the age of 4 to 16.

Performing arts
In 2007, the school received the Special Performing Arts Status after raising £50,000. The school spent the money on a new dance and drama studio.

House system
The school adopted a house system in 2011. The houses are Endeavor, Discovery, Intrepid and Victory, all named after historic British ships. The house system was in place prior to this with another house named Cardiff.

Notable former pupils

Northern Grammar School for Boys
 John Armitt CBE, Chief Executive from 1997-2001 of Costain Group, from 2001-2 of Railtrack, and from 2002-7 of Network Rail, and Chairman since 2007 of the Engineering and Physical Sciences Research Council (EPSRC) and Olympic Delivery Authority
 James Callaghan, Baron Callaghan of Cardiff, the UK Prime Minister from 1976 to 1979, completed his secondary education at the former (now Mayfield) Northern Secondary School in 1926.
 Sir Barry Cunliffe CBE, archaeologist
Sir Roger Fry (educationist) CBE. Founder King's Group 1981. Chairman (1996-2011) and President from 2011 Council of British International Schools.
 Mike Donkin, former BBC world affairs correspondent
 Sir John Pestell, Chief Adjudicator on Immigration Appeals from 1970-87 at Heathrow Airport
 Maj-Gen Brian Pennicott CVO, Colonel Commandant from 1991-6 of the Royal Artillery

See also
 Mayfield High School (London) in Dagenham
 The Portsmouth Grammar School - independent school, and former direct grant grammar school

References

External links
 Mayfield School Website
 Mayfield School League Tables, BBC News
 EduBase

Educational institutions established in 1932
Secondary schools in Portsmouth
School buildings completed in 1932
Community schools in Portsmouth
Primary schools in Portsmouth
1932 establishments in England